Miss India Worldwide 2006 was the 15th edition of the international beauty pageant. The final was held in Mumbai, India on  January 28, 2006. About 21 countries were represented in the pageant. Trina Chakravarty  of the United States was crowned as the winner at the end of the event.

Results

Special awards

Delegates
 – Tahirah Islam 
 – Nital Gosai 
 – Sabrina Naseem 
 – Pauline Poonam Nair 
 – Jessica Honoré 
 – Mona Singh 
 – Priyanka Jha
 – Ritika Sharma 
 – Chantal Mcdonald 
 – Bhavani Prasana Ramasendrain
 – Tejhall Jaiantilal 
 – Charlene Asgarali
 – Shardae Mitha 
 – Aakanksha Mansukhani 
 – Gaiyethri Dio Rahman 
 – Remona Moodley
 – Nadaraja Karthiga 
 – Indira Misir 
 – Rajani Sathyamurthi
 – Nikki Kaur Rana 
 – Trina Chakravarty

Crossovers
Contestants who previously competed or will compete at other beauty pageants:
Miss World
2012: :  Remona Moodley

References

External links
http://www.worldwidepageants.com/

2006 beauty pageants